Agata Balsamo (Nicolosi, 11 November 1970) is an Italian former long-distance runner.

Biography
In her career she won 4 times the national championships.

Achievements

National titles
1 win in 5000 metres at the Italian Athletics Championships (2003)
1 win in 10000 metres at the Italian Athletics Championships (1999)
2 wins in cross-country at the Italian Athletics Championships (2000, 2001)

See also
 Italian all-time top lists - 5000 metres
 Italian all-time top lists - 10000 metres

References

External links
 
 Agata Balsamo at All-Athletics.com

1968 births
Italian female long-distance runners
Universiade silver medalists in athletics (track and field)
Living people
Universiade silver medalists for Italy
Italian female cross country runners
Medalists at the 1997 Summer Universiade